Innerpeffray is a hamlet in Perthshire, Scotland,  southeast of Crieff. It is located on a raised promontory among beech woodland above the River Earn. A fording point across the river can still be used, on what is the line of a Roman Road.

The settlement mainly consists of an early complete and very important group of educational and religious buildings, all founded, built or rebuilt by the Drummond family of Strathearn.

Collegiate Chapel of St Mary

Innerpeffray Collegiate Church is an early-16th-century church. It is a scheduled monument.

John Drummond, 1st Lord Drummond is buried here.
Sir John Drummond 2nd of Innerpeffray (who built this chapel) is buried here, as well.

Innerpeffray Library

Innerpeffray Library is a historic subscription library and was the first lending library in Scotland. The current library building was completed in 1762 and is Category A listed.

Innerpeffray Castle

The land was controlled by Inchaffray Abbey until the Reformation when it was confiscated by the crown and sold to the Drummond family. The current ruinous 17th century L-plan tower house , south of the village, was built by James Drummond, 1st Baron Maderty, on the corner of a former Roman marching camp. The form and design is typical of the period in Scotland with crowstepped gables. The structure contains gunloops and windows. A vaulted basement lies under the structure.

Drummond Castle to the southwest of Crieff is the current Drummond family seat. The castle and the site of the Roman camp are both protected as scheduled monuments.

Innerpeffray railway station
Innerpeffray railway station to the north, now disused, served the hamlets of Innerpeffray and Millhills.

Notable people
 James Drummond, 1st Baron Maderty
 Maol Choluim de Innerpeffray

See also
 List of Category A listed buildings in Perth and Kinross
 List of places in Perth and Kinross

References

Villages in Perth and Kinross